Lesley Pattinama Kerkhove (born 4 November 1991) is a professional tennis player from the Netherlands.

She has won one doubles title on the WTA Tour, as well as nine singles and 17 doubles titles on the ITF Circuit. On 6 June 2022, she reached her best singles ranking of world No. 135. On 25 June 2018, she peaked at No. 58 in the doubles rankings.

Career
In July 2013, Kerkhove made her WTA Tour main-draw debut at the Swedish Open.

She made her Grand Slam debut at the 2017 US Open as a qualifier, and recorded her first major singles match-win at the 2021 Wimbledon Championships over Svetlana Kuznetsova.

She recorded her second major singles win as a lucky loser at the 2022 Wimbledon Championships over wildcard Sonay Kartal before being defeated by world No. 1, Iga Świątek, in three sets.

Personal life
In July 2019, she married football player Edinho Pattinama and changed her name to Pattinama Kerkhove.

Performance timelines

Only main-draw results in WTA Tour, Grand Slam tournaments, Fed Cup/Billie Jean King Cup and Olympic Games are included in win–loss records.

Singles
Current through the 2022 Wimbledon Championships.

Doubles

WTA career finals

Doubles: 6 (1 title, 5 runner-ups)

ITF Circuit finals

Singles: 24 (9 titles, 15 runner–ups)

Doubles: 30 (17 titles, 13 runner–ups)

Junior Grand Slam finals

Girls' doubles: 1 (runner–up)

Notes

References

External links

 
 
 

1991 births
Living people
Sportspeople from Goes
Dutch female tennis players